John IV Doukas Laskaris (or Ducas Lascaris) ( Δούκας Λάσκαρις, Iōannēs Doukas Laskaris) (December 25, 1250 – c. 1305) was emperor of Nicaea from August 16, 1258, to December 25, 1261. This empire was one of the Greek states formed from the remaining fragments of the Byzantine Empire, after the capture of Constantinople by Roman Catholics during the Fourth Crusade in 1204.

Biography
John was a son of Theodore II Doukas Laskaris, Emperor of Nicaea, and Elena of Bulgaria. His maternal grandparents were Emperor Ivan Asen II of Bulgaria and his second wife Anna Maria of Hungary. Anna was originally named Mária and was the eldest daughter of Andrew II of Hungary and Gertrude of Merania.

John IV was only seven years old when he inherited the throne on the death of his father. The young monarch was the last member of the Laskarid dynasty, which had done much to restore the Byzantine Empire. His regent was originally the bureaucrat George Mouzalon, but Mouzalon was murdered by the nobility, and the nobles' leader Michael Palaiologos usurped the post. Soon, on January 1, 1259, Palaiologos made himself co-emperor as Michael VIII. Michael was, in fact, John's second cousin once removed, since they were both descended from Euphrosyne Doukaina Kamatera, Empress consort to Byzantine Emperor Alexios Komnenos Angelos.
After Michael's conquest of Constantinople from the Latin Empire on July 25, 1261, John IV was left behind at Nicaea, and was later blinded on Michael's orders on his eleventh birthday, December 25, 1261. This made him ineligible for the throne, and he was exiled and imprisoned in a fortress in Bithynia. This action led to the excommunication of Michael VIII Palaiologos by the Patriarch Arsenius Autoreianus, and a later revolt led by a Pseudo-John IV near Nicaea.

John IV spent the remainder of his life as a monk in Dacibyza. There is a rescript of Charles of Anjou, dated 9 May 1273, which refers to a report that John escaped from his imprisonment and invites him to come to his court. Further documents attest to his arrival and receiving a pension from the Angevin arch-enemy of Michael Palaiologos. However, this contradicts the evidence of the historians George Pachymeres and Nikephoros Gregoras, who record that John remained in Dacibyza until long after Michael's death. In his study of Michael VIII's reign, historian Deno John Geanakoplos discusses the contradictory evidence and comes to the conclusion that the documents of Charles of Anjou were intended to serve as propaganda, "to attract the support of the legitimist, pro-Lascarid Greeks of the Byzantine Empire, as well as to sway the anti-Angevin sentiment of the still surviving Greek population of Charles' own territories of southern Italy and Sicily."

In 1290 John was visited by Michael VIII's son and successor Andronikos II Palaiologos, who sought forgiveness for his father's blinding three decades earlier. As Donald Nicol notes, "The occasion must have been embarrassing for both parties, but especially for Andronikos who, after all, was the beneficiary of his father's crimes against John Laskaris." The deposed emperor died about 1305 and was eventually recognized as a saint, whose memory was revered in Constantinople in the 14th century.

Ancestry

See also

List of Byzantine emperors

References

Bibliography

 - Total pages: 245

Further reading
The Oxford Dictionary of Byzantium, Oxford University Press, 1991.

John 04
John 04
Monarchs deposed as children
John 04
13th-century Byzantine emperors
14th-century Byzantine people
1250 births
1305 deaths
Greek Christian monks
Eastern Orthodox monarchs
Byzantine prisoners and detainees
Michael VIII Palaiologos
Sons of Byzantine emperors